When the Door Opened is a 1925 American silent Northern film directed by Reginald Barker and starring Jacqueline Logan, Walter McGrail, Margaret Livingston, Robert Cain, Frank Keenan, and Roy Laidlaw. It was written by Bradley King. The film was released on December 6, 1925, by Fox Film Corporation.

Plot
As described in a review in a film magazine, Clive Grenfel (McGrail), returning home unexpectedly, saw "when the door opened" his wife in another man's arms. He kills this man Fredericks and seeks solace in the northwoods. There he meets stern old De Fontenac (Keenan), a courtly gentleman of the old school, and his beautiful granddaughter Teresa (Logan), who falls in love with him. Believing himself a murderer, Clive fights against this love. A stranger appears and turns out to be a villain. Clive finally learns that the stanger is really Fredericks and that he has married Clive's wife who secured a divorce. No longer believing himself to be a slayer, Clive is now happy in the arms of Teresa.

Cast

References

External links

 

1925 films
American black-and-white films
Films based on American novels
Films based on novels by James Oliver Curwood
Films directed by Reginald Barker
Fox Film films
Northern (genre) films
1920s English-language films
1920s American films